Solmarisidae is a family of hydrozoans in the order Narcomedusae. The name is sometimes spelled "Solmaridae".

Characteristics
Members of this family have dome-shaped bells and numerous tentacles set above the undulating margin of the bell. They do not have gastric pouches as do other members of the order. The gonads are situated inside the wall of the stomach.

Genera and species
The World Register of Marine Species lists the following genera and species:
Pegantha Haeckel, 1879
Pegantha clara Bigelow, 1909
Pegantha laevis H. B. Bigelow, 1909
Pegantha martagon Haeckel, 1879
Pegantha rubiginosa (Kölliker, 1853)
Pegantha triloba Haeckel, 1879
Solmaris
Solmaris corona (Keferstein & Ehlers, 1861)
Solmaris flavescens (Kölliker, 1853)
Solmaris lenticula Haeckel, 1879
Solmaris leucostyla (Will, 1844)
Solmaris quadrata Bouillon, Boero & Seghers, 1991
Solmaris rhodoloma (Brandt, 1838)
Solmaris solmaris (Gegenbaur, 1856)

References

 
Narcomedusae
Cnidarian families
Taxa named by Ernst Haeckel